The Fairholme Group is a stratigraphic unit of Late Devonian (Frasnian) age. It is present on the western edge of the Western Canada Sedimentary Basin in the Rocky Mountains and foothills of Alberta and British Columbia. It was named for the Fairholme Range near Exshaw in the Canadian Rockies by H.H. Beach in 1943.

The formations of the Fairholme Group include fossils of marine animals such as stromatoporoids, corals, brachiopods, crinoids, and conodonts.

Lithology
The Fairholme Group was deposited in marine environments and can be subdivided into three gross lithologic units:

 The basal carbonate platform sequence of the Flume Formation, or in southern areas the Hollebeke and Borsato Formations, which are composed of limestones and dolomites.
 The carbonate buildups (reefal sequences) of the Cairn and Southesk Formations, also composed of limestones and dolomites.
 The basin-fill clastic rocks of the Maligne, Perdrix, and Mount Hawk Formations, which consist primarily of mudstones, argillaceous limestones, and calcareous shales. These are laterally equivalent to the reefal units.

Distribution and thickness
The Fairholme Group is present in the Canadian Rockies from the Kakwa Lakes area of northeastern British Columbia, south through Alberta to the Flathead River region of southeastern British Columbia, as well as in the subsurface beneath the immediately adjacent plains to the east. Where fully developed, the group reaches thicknesses from about 300 to 728 m (980 to 2400 feet).

Relationship to other units
The Fairholm Group overlies the Beaverhill Lake Group in the southern Alberta plains, and unconformably overlies the Middle Devonian Yahatinda Formation or pre-Devonian formations in the mountains. It is overlain by the Crowfoot Formation in the plains, and the Sassenach, Alexo or, rarely, the Palliser Formation in the mountains. It is equivalent to the Woodbend Group and the lower part of the Winterburn Group of the plains.

References

See also 
 List of fossiliferous stratigraphic units in Alberta

Geologic groups of North America
Western Canadian Sedimentary Basin
Devonian Alberta
Geologic formations of Alberta
Paleontology in Alberta
Devonian southern paleotropical deposits
Frasnian Stage
Dolomite formations
Limestone formations
Fossiliferous stratigraphic units of North America